Pinoy Big Brother: Celebrity Edition, retroactively known as Pinoy Big Brother: Celebrity Edition 1, is the first celebrity season of the Philippine ABS-CBN reality television series Pinoy Big Brother and the second season overall. It was originally broadcast without a season number, but was later officially given the title of Pinoy Big Brother: Celebrity Edition 1 to distinguish it from Pinoy Big Brother: Celebrity Edition 2.

The first celebrity edition officially began on February 5, 2006, and ran for 56 days, ending on April 1, 2006, and were hosted by Toni Gonzaga and Mariel Rodriguez. The series was originally scheduled to start a day before but due to the Wowowee ULTRA stampede that happened earlier that day, the management rescheduled it the next day. Due to the happening, Willie Revillame dropped his hosting stint from the show.

The prizes at stake cost three million Philippine pesos, which includes a million pesos for the winning housemate, another million for the winner's chosen charity, and another million for the charity of Big Brother's choice. Aside from the cash prizes, a condominium unit in Valenzuela City is also at stake.

The Big Brother house that is used on this edition is the same as the house used on the first season, although there were some changes in the house's interior.

The show began with a welcome party along Manila Bay. They were transported by yacht before the chosen housemates was formally introduced and were taken to the Big Brother House. A prayer that is led by Jesuit priest Fr. Tito Caluag, S.J., a minute of silence and a performance of "You Raise Me Up" were done before the show started to commemorate those who have been affected by the Wowowee stampede. Furthermore, Myx VJ Luis Manzano played pinch hitter for Willie Revillame, who was at the time still devastated by the said stampede.

Talk show host Boy Abunda hosted the Big Debate, a debate show which celebrity supporters of the four housemates debate on who should be the winner of the series. The debate was held two nights before the Big Night.

The edition uses a different theme song, Sikat Ang Pinoy (Filipinos Are Famous), by Sam Milby and Toni Gonzaga, although the original theme song Pinoy Ako is occasionally used.

The program is produced and can be seen through ABS-CBN, Studio 23, the show's 24/7 cable channel, and the internet (ABS-CBN Now).

House interior theme
The concept for this series is going back to basics. On the first day the Big Brother House initially had no furniture or appliances, with the exception of the plasma TV and the refrigerator. Part of this series' concept was forcing the housemates to use a stick for brushing their teeth, clay jars and an outdoor kitchen for cooking, bare hands for eating, and a water pump for potable water. All pieces of furniture provided to them were even made of bamboo.

After two weeks, Big Brother lifted the "Back to Basics" concept after seeing the housemates adapting to the said lifestyle, despite difficulties. The Forbidden Room, a pink-walled room with beds and mattresses reserved only for eviction nominees, became the ladies' bedroom, while the bamboo beds in the eventual men's bedroom were suddenly covered with mattresses. Earlier, they were provided with a microwave oven, an electric stove, utensils, and some toothbrushes and were allowed to use the swimming pool at any time, as well as wearing footwear indoors. Later, sofas replaced the bamboo benches in the living room.

Celebrity housemates
Below are the housemates who are introduced in the Grand Welcome Party. Rather than twelve in the original edition, fourteen were chosen for this edition and are listed below in order of introduction. Days before the Grand Welcome Party, only their feet were shown. However, in the morning of the Grand Welcome Party's new date, the Philippine Star prematurely published a full-page advertisement showing the new housemates in full view.

Houseguests
Similar to the franchise's previous seasons, Big Brother invited guests to his house for special purposes.

Notable houseguest for this season were Jasmine Trias, Sandara Park, Jason Gainza, Nene Tamayo and Tirso Cruz III.

Chronology
 February 21: Gretchen left the house on after Big Brother allowed Gretchen to report to her superiors in the Philippine Air Force, where she serves as a second-class airwoman, to face a summary investigation about her being AWOL, as reported by the Philippine Daily Inquirer. He did this in the proviso that she cannot talk to anyone except those who were investigating her and she must return to the house 24 hours after she left. She returned 14 hours later after the Philippine Air Force officially authorized her to continue her stint in the show.
 February 23: Rico and Aleck had their heads shaved in exchange for P100,000 for each of their beneficiaries: Aleck's father and Mich's caretaker. Rico took what is supposed to be Mich's sacrifice because the latter was advised not to do so due to her emotional anxiety. Their hair was donated to make wigs for young cancer patients.
 February 28: Rustom came out of the closet on national TV by revealing to fellow housemate Keanna Reeves that he is a homosexual. Although parts of it were aired later in the day as it is traditionally, it was aired the next day in its entirety. 
 March 6–7: Jasmine Trias visited the housemates and stayed in the house overnight.
 March 10: Gretchen, Rustom, and Rico temporarily "exited" the house as sacrifice for their nominated friends Aleck, Keanna, and Roxanne respectively. It turns out that it was actually a task to test their trust to their friends. Gretchen and Rico returned in the wee hours of the next day while Rustom returned in morning. Voting was not affected regardless.
 March 22: After Rustom's exit, it was announced that Toni handed over her main hosting chores to Mariel, starting the next day. Season 1 contestants Say Alonzo and Uma Khouny would take over as hosts of UpLate. Luis would host the last eviction night. At the time, Toni had her official engagements in the United States. She only returned on the night of the Teen Edition's finale.
 March 26: Season 1 contestant Jason Gainza and ABS-CBN actress Sandara Park entered the house disguised as hooded secret agents to steal the housemates' golden eggs under the directions of Big Brother. Although the two did manage to steal John and Zanjoe's eggs, the housemates found the agents, and as a result the two stayed overnight. Earlier in the day, with the blindfolded housemates as virtual nannies, child stars (from ABS-CBN's Goin' Bulilit and Little Big Star) entered the house and created chaos, also as instructed by Big Brother.
 March 27–28: Season 1 winner Nene Tamayo and veteran actor Tirso Cruz III also entered the house as hooded secret agents, trying to steal John and Zanjoe's eggs. Unlike Jason and Sandara before them, they were successful in stealing John's 25 eggs and Zanjoe's 22. Another season 1 contestant, Franzen Fajardo, would later join the two to steal various supplies to test the housemates.

Nomination History

Legend
 Housemate was automatically nominated as part of a rule violation or other special cases.

:  With Angela's exit on Day 12, the eviction on Day 14 was canceled and was made into a nomination night.
:  Big Brother automatically put up for Eviction the nominees from the previous nominations, whom were saved after Angela's exit.
:  Big Brother automatically nominated Christian and Rustom for their violations, and therefore only the housemate with the highest nomination points was included in the list of nominees.
:  Open voting for the Big 4 was announced after Budoy's exit.

Pinoy Big Brother Celebrity Challenge
Since the stampede that happened on February 4, 2006, the show Wowowee was taken off the air. To take over the time slot it left behind, Pinoy Big Brother aired a special noontime edition called Pinoy Big Brother Celebrity Challenge, in which the celebrity housemates play mini-games for charities of their choice, inclusive only to the housemates' charities. It started on Saturday, February 11, 2006. It aired its last episode on March 4, 2006, having raised a total of P1,440,000 (about US$28,235) for the various charities.

Big Brother Finale
The four remaining housemates, were taken to the Manila Post Office from the Big Brother house in Quezon City by a limousine. They were then sequestered in a secret location before the actual live final.

The finale was held on April 1, 2006, at the Manila Post Office building on Lawton, Manila. In the final tally, Keanna Reeves was declared the Big Winner, garnering 44.2% of the vote (571,607 votes). John Prats came in second with 28.8% (372,198 votes), Bianca Gonzalez in third with 19% (245,594 votes), while Zanjoe Marudo exited first (and therefore came in last) with 8% (103,422 votes).

Pinoy Big Brother (Celebrity Edition) Soundtrack 
 Maligo Na Jam
 Your Girl
 Chill (Sa Aking Duyan)
 Love Is True
 Panaginip
 Sikat Ang Pinoy
 Sikat Ang Pinoy (Dance Remix)
 Budoy Ako (Pinoy Ako Visayan Adaptation)
 Maligo Na Jam (Acoustic Version) 
 Your Girl (Acoustic Version)

References

External links
 Pinoy Big Brother - Celebrity Edition

2006 Philippine television seasons
Pinoy Big Brother seasons